"Tramp" is a song included as a track on the Stranglers' sixth studio album, La Folie. "Tramp" was originally thought to be the ideal follow-up to their Top Ten hit single, "Golden Brown". However, Jean-Jacques Burnel convinced fellow band members that the album title track, "La Folie" was a much better choice. This backfired when "La Folie" only peaked at No. 47 on the UK Singles Chart.

References

1981 songs
The Stranglers songs
Songs written by Hugh Cornwell
Songs written by Jean-Jacques Burnel
Songs written by Dave Greenfield
Songs written by Jet Black